The Tuipelehake (or Tui Pelehake to be more consistent with similar titles, like Tuʻi Tonga, Tuʻi Haʻatakalaua and Tuʻi Kanokupolu) is the second highest ranking chiefly title in Tonga. In the absence of the ancient Tui Faleua title, the Tuipelehake title is second in rank after the King's title, Tuʻi Kanokupolu. There have been several holders of the title mainly from the ruling royal family, from princes to prime ministers. It is Tongan custom to refer to the holder by his customary title, only adding his given name if confusion may arise. For example, Tui Pelehake (Uluvalu).

The Estates of the Tui Pelehake are:
 Fatai a town estate in Nukualofa on Tongatapu
 Village of Pelehake in the eastern district on Tongatapu
 Village of 'Alakifonua in the eastern district on Tongatapu
 Tonga's main airport, Fuaamotu International Airport, is also situated on his estate and not, as the name misleadingly suggests, in neighbouring Fuaamotu.
 Village of Vaihoi in Vavau, close to the villages of Leimatu'a and Holonga
 Village of Foa in Haapai

Origin
All of the noble titles of Tonga were formalised into their current states through royal decree under the Constitution of 1875.  This hierarchy of titles were instituted by King George Tāufaāhau Tupou I in 19th century. The Tui Pelehake was one of the six most ancient titles of Tonga.  The fact that these six titles were held by some of the most powerful chiefs of the day, ultimately saved from extinction.  While, on the other hand, Tupou I allowed hundreds of other titles-of-nobility to fall into abeyance. The Tui Pelehake title goes back to the first Tui Tonga, Ahoeitu, in the 10th century. His oldest brother, Talafale, was bestowed the titles Tui Pelehake and Tui Faleua, backup titles in case the Tui Tonga line would die out. Note that the original Tui Pelehake title therefore derives its authority from the Tui Tonga, even though it came to King George Tupou II, it has been essentially linked to the Tui Kanokupolu.

Holders of the noble title

Lekaumoana
Lekaumoana's oldest son Maile Latamai was banished to Fiji, his younger son Uluvalu became the next Tui'pelehake.

Uluvalu
He was the son of Lekaumoana

Filiaipulotu
He was the son of Uluvalu. He married Sālote Pilolevu, the daughter of George Tupou I.

Toutaitokotaha

Siaosi Fatafehi Toutaitokotaha, 1842–1912.
He was the son of Filiaipulotu and the father of King George Tupou II.
He was Prime Minister of Tonga in 1905. After his death the title remained vacant as the king had no need for it. Neither was there any need for the title during the reign of his successor, Queen Sālote Tupou III.

Fatafehi Tu'i Faleua
Sione Ngū Manumataongo (7 January 1922 – 10 April 1999), was the youngest son of Queen Sālote Tupou III and The Prince Consort, 'Uiliami Mailefihi Tungi.  Prince Sione was educated in Tonga and Australia. He attended Newington College, Sydney, (1941–1942) and an agricultural college in Queensland. Fatafehi married Melenaite Tupoumoheofo Veikune (13 November 1924 – 16 March 1993) on the same day as his older brother, the Crown Prince (in that time still called Tupoutoa-Tungī) married Halaevalu Mataaho Ahomee. That was the famous double royal wedding (taane māhanga) of 10 June 1947. He received the titles of Tui Pelehake and Fatafehi from his mother in 1944.  He also received Tonga's second highest title-of-nobility, Tu'i Faleua  (King of the Second House) during this time. TPrince John was also honoured with the CBE or Commander of the Order of the British Empire. The Prince inherited from his mother an artistic side; he was a well-known poet and composer.

He began a career in government service, alongside his elder brother, the Crown Prince Tupouto'a-Tungi.  Prince Sione's first appointment was as the Governor of Vava'u i(1949–1952) and later as Governor of Haapai (1952–1953). He held various ministerial portfolios in cabinet, until he took over as Prime Minister in 1965.  His brother had just vacated the Office of Prime Minister on becoming King.  Prince Tu'ipelehake remained Tonga's Prime Minister until 1991 until he was forced to withdraw therefrom because of serious health problems. His last years were spent in a rollchair and on a life support system.

He kept the both titles of Tui Pelehake and Tui Faleua for so many years, that they became synonymous with him. But after his death, only the former was conferred to his son, while the latter returned to the king.

Uluvalu

Sione Uluvalu Takeivūlai Ngū Tukuaho (7 October 1950 – 6 July 2006) held the title of Tui Pelehake from the death of his father in 1991 until his own death in 2006.  Prince 'Uluvalu died in an automobile accident near San Francisco, California on 6 July 2006. He played a key role in mediating between the Government of Tonga and striking civil servants in 2005. At the time of his death he was in the US for consultations with Tongans living there concerning political and constitutional reforms.  This programme of reforms was to have been presented to his uncle, King Taufa'ahau Tupou IV

to present ideas for political reform to his uncle, the king. Prince Uluvalu and his wife, Princess Kaimana, died without children.

They were buried at langi Nāmoala in Mua on 21 July, apparently as a reminder of the title's Tui Tonga heritage, and not at Malaekula in Nukualofa where all kings find their rest.

Mailefihi
When a title holder dies without heir, the title returns to the king, who then will decide what to do with it. In this case he decided to give it, on 21 July 2006, to Uluvalu's younger brother, Viliami Tupoulahi Mailefihi Tuku'aho (17 June 1957 – 2014) known as Mailefihi. Mailefihi lost his right to the title 'Prince' and inherited claim to the royal throne with his first marriage to Mele Vikatolia Faletau, step daughter and adopted daughter of Hon. Akauola Inoke Faletau and birth daughter of Mrs. Evelini Hurrell - Akauaola. Mele Vikatolia is an issue from then the previous relationship of her biological mother, Evelini Hurrell during bachelorette. This marriage was against the wishes of his uncle King Tāufaāhau Tupou IV. From this first marriage he had two children a daughter and a son;
Hon. Taone Tukuaho
Hon. Ngū Tukuaho
To the dismay of the royal family his next two marriages were to particularly commers women. His second marriage in 1996 was to Maata Moungaloa, a beauty queen who won the yearly Miss Heilala beauty pageant. His third marriage was to 'Alakifonua villager Eneio Tatafu styled HSH Princess Tuipelehake in 2008, whom he divorced in 2010. They had one adopted daughter:

Hon. Anaseini Takipo Michelle Alexdra Tuku'aho

The His fourth and current wife is Fifita Holeva Tuihaangana, a member of one of the low noble families in Tonga from Haano, a tiny island in the Haapai group. Fifita Holeva have 3 issues from previous relationships.

Mailefihi returned to great prominence upon the death of his older brother Uluvalu in July 2006.  Shortly after his brother's death he was bestowed the Tuipelehake title by his uncle King Tāufaāhau Tupou IV.  In August of the same year via a by-election he won his brother's vacated seat in Parliament.  In 2008 his 'Prince' title was restored back to him by his first cousin King George Tupou V and is known as His Serene Highness Prince Tu'ipelehake.  In 2009 he became a Minister of the Realm when he was appointed Minister of Agriculture, Forestry and Fisheries. He died of complications from diabetes in June 2014.

Mailefihi died on Saturday 14 June 2014 at Vaiola Hospital in Tonga. It is understood Prince Tuipelehake was admitted to Vaiola Hospital on 2 June with complications from diabetes. Mailefihi had been a diabetes patient for a number of years, and had previously undergone amputation of both legs. He was 56.

Viliami Sione Ngu Takeivulai

On 8 July 2014, Hon. Viliami Sione Ngu Takeivulai Tuku’aho (born 5 January 1986) was installed as His Serene Highness Prince Tu’ipelehake. He replaces his late father Prince Tu'ipelehake - Mailefihi, who died a month before on Saturday 14 June 2014. He was known as Sione Ngu who became 8th in line for the Tu'ipelehake title and he was installed at the Falelotu Fotu 'a e 'Eiki in Pelehake. He is a military officer (Lieutenant) at His Majesty's Armed Forces (formerly as Tonga Defense Services). He was married to Cassandra Tu'ipelehake (formerly known as Hon. Cassandra Vaea Tuku'aho. Cassandra was adopted by the Late Baron Vaea of Houma and his wife, Baroness Tuputupu Ma'afu-Vaea which is the parents of HM The Queen of Tonga. Cassandra is the daughter of Lord Vaea - formerly known as Hon. 'Alipate Tu'ivanuavou Vaea, HM The Queen of Tonga's only brother. Cassandra is an issue of a previous relationship of then, Alipate Tu'ivanuavou Vaea when he was a bachelor by a commoner with High Chief ancestors bloodline in four South Pacific Island countries of 1) Tonga - descent of Tui Tonga Laufilitonga, 2) Fiji - a descent of High Chief Tuisoso (Mokofisi) of Nukunuku Village in Lakemba, son of Chief Tuilakeba of Lakemba descent from High Chief Tui Nayau of the Lau Group, 3) Samoa - a descent of Princess Fetunu, daughter of Tui Kanokupolu Ngata I & Princess Tohuia Limapo of Chief AMA from Samoa & 6th Tui Haatakalaua and 4) Wallis & Futuna, a great-great-great-granddaughter of Tui Uvea Manuka. His Serene Highness, Prince Tu'ipelehake married on 19 July 2008 at Polata'ane, and they have two children a son and a daughter; however were later divorced with Cassandra. She is now Dame Cassandra Vaea with her investiture ceremony to the Dame of Grace on 29 Nov 2022 of the Ancient and Most Noble Order of St Lazarus at St.Barnabas Anglican Church, Roseneath, Wellington, New Zealand. Dame Cassandra is the Representative of the Order St Lazarus of Jerusalem to the Kingdom of Tonga.  
 Hon. Siaosi Tupoulahi Tukuaho
 Hon. Melenaite Tupoumoheofo Tukuaho

References

Bibliography
 Elizabeth Wood-Ellem, Queen Sālote of Tonga, Auckland University Press, 1999, and several other books
 Tonga Chronicle, 3 August 2006

External links
 "TU'I PELEHAKE (Title)", Non-European Royalty website
 "Mailefihi becomes 7th Tu’ipelehake," Matangi, Tonga Online, Tonga News: Royalty & Nobility, 1 August 2006.

Tongan chiefs
History of Tonga